Radomir Lazović (born 1980) is a Serbian activist, politician, and a designer. A member of the left-wing Do not let Belgrade drown (NDB) organisation, he has served as a member of the National Assembly of Serbia since 1 August 2022.

Born in Belgrade, he studied at the Ninth Belgrade Gymnasium and the University of Belgrade. A designer who worked as an art and technical director, he entered the art scene in 2010. He co-founded the "Street Gallery" initiative, with whom he organised art exhibitions, and the "Ministry of Space" collective, where he dealt with urban and cultural policies of Belgrade. He also organised actions with the "Cinemas – the return of the written off" informal group that re-opened several abandoned cinemas in Belgrade in 2014. A member of the board of directors of the Association of the Independent Cultural Scene of Serbia from 2013 to 2015, he served as its president from 2015 to 2017. He also co-founded and led the "Micro Amateur Film Festival" and "Inex film" initiatives.

He entered politics in 2014 after co-founding the NDB initiative in 2014. Alongside Dobrica Veselinović, he has opposed the Belgrade Waterfront project and organised several protests against it in 2015. After the demolition of privately-owned objects in Savamala, he took part in mass protests from May to October 2016. He took part in the 2018 Belgrade City Assembly election, although NDB failed to win any seats. He later took part in the formation of the "Civic Front" coalition in 2019 and announced that NDB would boycott the 2020 Serbian parliamentary election, claiming that the conditions would not be fair. In 2020, he was elected member of the Minor Council of NDB. As one of the representatives of NDB, he began cooperating with Aleksandar Jovanović Ćuta and Nebojša Zelenović in 2021, and later took part in the environmental protests that were organised that year. He took part in the We Must coalition, which NDB is part of, and was placed sixth on its ballot list for the 2022 Serbian parliamentary election. During the campaign period, he promoted environmentalist, anti-corruption, and anti-economic inequality policies. He was elected as member of the National Assembly, and sworn in on 1 August 2022, after which he also became the president of the NDB parliamentary group.

A critic of Aleksandar Vučić and his Serbian Progressive Party (SNS), he also criticised their approach towards the environment. Additionally, he criticised the far-right and stated that he would not "flirt with nationalism and chauvinism". Lazović is a critic of neoliberalism, supporter of workers rights, and a critic of the Anglo-Australian mining company Rio Tinto. He supports the accession of Serbia to the European Union, aligning Serbia's foreign policies with the European Union, and implementing sanctions against Russia due to their 2022 invasion of Ukraine.

Early life and education 
Radomir Lazović was born in 1980 in Belgrade, SR Serbia, SFR Yugoslavia. He studied at the Ninth Belgrade Gymnasium and the Faculty of Agriculture at the University of Belgrade. He was a basketball player in his youth.

Career

Art career (2010–2018) 
As an artist, Lazović has been active in the scene since 2010. He co-founded the "Street Gallery" initiative in 2010; he had stated that one of the reasons behind the formation of the initiative was the desire to be involved in "engaged art". According to him, the exhibitions that have been organised by the Street Gallery initiative occur every three weeks on average. Their first "illegal" exhibition was held in 2010, although, the official opening was organised in April 2012. He co-founded the Ministry of Space collective in 2010, in which he mainly dealt with urban and cultural policies of Belgrade. Additionally, Lazović has also led the "Micro Art" non-governmental organisation. He took part in a fair that was organised by his organisation in 2011. Lazović was the screenplayer of Flirting, a short feature film made by Micro Art in 2012. As a member of the "Cinemas – the return of the written off" informal group, he had organised actions that re-opened several abandoned cinemas in Belgrade. The Ministry of Space collective took part in reviving the "Zvezda" cinema in December 2014. He was one of the organisers of the 2015 Transeuropa Festival in Belgrade. He was also a member of the board of directors of the Association of the Independent Cultural Scene of Serbia from 2013 to 2015, and its president from 2015 to 2017. He took part in the Occupied Cinema movie in 2018. Lazović also co-founded and led the "Micro Amateur Film Festival" and "Inex film" initiatives.

Early political career (2014–2018) 

Together with activists from the Ministry of Space collective, Lazović co-founded the Do not let Belgrade d(r)own (NDB) initiative in 2014, an initiative that would oppose the construction of the Belgrade Waterfront project. He described the initiative as a "coalition of organizations and individuals who are interested into the development of Belgrade", and he also added that they would oppose "shady deals made by investors and politicians for their self-interests". In company with Dobrica Veselinović and other members of the NDB initiative, he protested inside the City Assembly of Belgrade following the adoption of the amendments to the General Urban Plan for Belgrade in September 2014. He protested outside the building of the National Assembly in April 2015, during which he and other activists held a giant rubber duck; he stated that the duck resembled lex specialis and the Belgrade Waterfront project, which he described as "a big scam, or a duck that we must not fall for". He continued to take part in protests that were organised by NDB after July 2015. As an experiment, he tried to buy an apartment that is located in the Belgrade Waterfront complex in late 2015, although he failed to do so. In December 2015, Lazović and Veselinović were heard in the Misdemeanor Court after allegedly violating the Law on Citizens' Gathering.

Following the demolition of private objects in Savamala, NDB had begun organising protests in May 2016. Lazović took part in the protests which were also held later in June 2016 and afterwards; NDB continued to organise the protests up to late October 2016. Tabloid newspaper Informer, and television channels Pink and Studio B, attacked Lazović and other organisers during the protests. During a protest-related interview in June 2016, he stated that "we have to find a way to marginalize professional politicians" and to put "people before profit". Initially, several thousand demonstrators took part in the protests, and the number of demonstrators later grew to around 15,000. In a February 2017 interview, he added that "when the protests get bigger, they get terrible afraid and do even worse things". He also took part in a series of protests that took place in April 2017. A month later, Lazović organised and held a public discussion regarding NDB's plans with Veselinović.

Lazović announced in August 2017 that NDB would take part in the 2018 Belgrade City Assembly election. He had also said that NDB would not seek partnerships with already-existing political parties. Later in October 2017, he criticised Dragan Đilas and declined to cooperate with the Democratic Party (DS). Instead, Lazović stated that NDB would partner with local initiatives. Shortly before the election, he was detained by the police after spray painting "crime scene" in the Hercegovačka street in Savamala. Former Ombudsman Saša Janković, leader of the Movement of Free Citizens (PSG), condemned the act, while Lazović stated that "he did not know on what basis was he detained". Lazović was placed third on the NDB ballot list, although the ballot list only won 3.4% of the popular vote, and because of it NDB did not win any seats. Following the election, Lazović stated that NDB achieved the results in "very difficult conditions", and that because of it "NDB cannot be dissatisfied". He also stated that "nothing will change even after the election of Zoran Radojičić as mayor". He emphasised the formation of a "civic front" after the election, and stated that "he is convinced that a strong left-wing option would be able to enter the scene". He later took part in a series of mass anti-government protests which began in November 2018.

Opposition activities (2019–2021) 

In company with two local organisations from Niš and Kraljevo, NDB announced the formation of the "Civic Front" in February 2019. Lazović stated that the front would gather people around "the fight against poverty". He previously said that he would not want NDB to be a part of the catch-all Alliance for Serbia coalition. He received a note from the police in July 2019 about allegedly violating the Law on Public Assembly in April 2016; he described the move as "political". During an interview on 7 July, he stated that he would pay the fine. Lazović took part in the 2019 Belgrade Pride event; he wanted to hand Prime Minister Ana Brnabić a rubber duck, the symbol of NDB, although she rejected his gift. In October 2019, he announced that NDB would boycott the 2020 parliamentary election, claiming that the conditions would not be fair. He later claimed that the government would fake the voter turnout. 

In January and February 2020, Lazović, as the representative of NDB, took part in protests in support of clean air. After the proclamation of the COVID-19 pandemic in Serbia, he took part in "Noise Against the Dictatorship" protests that NDB organised. He had also criticised government's approach towards the pandemic. Following the 2020 parliamentary election, he proclaimed that "the boycott absolutely succeeded". A series of violent protests broke out in Belgrade after the election; Lazović condemned the violence. On 20 October 2020, Lazović was elected member of the Minor Council of NDB. A day later, he took part in a debate with opposition political figures Marinika Tepić, Pavle Grbović, Nebojša Zelenović, and Jovo Bakić. In December 2020, Lazović stated his support for cooperating with other opposition parties regarding electoral conditions. He had also stated that NDB would take part in inter-party dialogues on electoral conditions with delegators from the European Union. During the inter-party dialogues on electoral conditions in 2021, Lazović stated his support for the separation of election dates.

Lazović expressed his support for the formation of several ideological blocs for the 2022 Belgrade City Assembly election in February 2021. In July 2021, he revealed to the public that NDB had been in contact with Aleksandar Jovanović Ćuta, a prominent environmental activist. He also added that pre-election cooperation with Zelenović would be also possible. Lazović took part in an environmental protest in Loznica in late July, shortly before the beginning of the 2021–2022 environmental protests in September 2021. Together with activists from NDB, Lazović reported in early August that a fire erupted in Vinča. Shortly after, Informer, Alo!, and Pink published stories in which they claimed that Lazović and other NDB activists were the ones who started the fire. Lazović denied the claims, stating that he received reports from citizens, and that "firefighters were also present in the area". A few days later, he announced that NDB received support from the European Green Party, as well as from the eco-socialist We Can and green United Reform Action political parties. Lazović took part in environmental protests that were organised from September 2021 till February 2022. He condemned the violence that took place during the protests. In late September 2021, Lazović and Zelenović presented a proposal for cooperation between opposition parties, which also included the formation of ideological blocs for the 2022 general election, something that Lazović had already previously proposed. A month later, Lazović announced that NDB would take part in the next general election; he also endorsed Veselinović as the candidate for mayor of Belgrade. By then, the media had begun labelling the coalition between Ćuta, Lazović, and Zelenović as the "green-left" bloc. In late December 2021, Lazović stated his opposition to the January 2022 constitutional referendum.

2022 election and aftermath (2022–present) 

The "green-left" bloc was formalised in January 2022, under the name We Must. Lazović supported the nomination of a joint opposition candidate for the presidential election, although he expressed his dissatisfaction in Utisak nedelje, a political talk show, in which he claimed that other parties did not approach to discuss. A month later, the We Must coalition ended up nominating Biljana Stojković. Lazović described Zdravko Ponoš, the United for the Victory of Serbia coalition-nominated presidential candidate, as the candidate for "right-wingers". Lazović took part in the We Must election campaign, during which he emphasised on non-aggression tactics towards other opposition political parties. He campaigned on an environmentalist, anti-corruption, and anti-economic inequality platform. He also took part in debates that were organised by the Radio Television of Serbia. Lazović was placed sixth on the We Must ballot list for the parliamentary election, and was also a candidate in the 2022 Belgrade City Assembly election. The We Must coalition won 4.7% of the popular vote and 13 seats in the National Assembly, and thus he was elected as member of the National Assembly. A day after the election, he participated in a protest outside the building of the Republic Electoral Commission (RIK). Lazović was also elected as a member of the City Assembly of Belgrade, but resigned on 11 June.

Following the election, he criticised the approach of Aleksandar Vučić, the president of Serbia, towards the inconclusive outcome of the 2022 Belgrade City Assembly election. He also criticised the meeting between Vučić and Đilas, the leader of Party of Freedom and Justice (SSP). A dispute in the We Must coalition regarding the intellectual property of its name emerged in June 2022; NDB claimed it as its intellectual property, although it withdrew the request that it sent to the Intellectual Property Office. Lazović stated that the intellectual property would be property of the coalition, and not NDB. He gave a speech in the European Parliament on 30 June 2022, in which he criticised the Government of Serbia's approach towards the environment, quality of life, and rule of law. A month later, he participated in an environmental protest in Novi Sad in which he was attacked. Lazović was sworn in as member of the National Assembly on 1 August; he also became the president of the NDB parliamentary group. He stated that NDB would remain in opposition to SNS. Lazović announced the re-formation of NDB in September 2022, stating that it would adopt a new name and work on to become a registered political party. In October and November 2022, Srpski telegraf, a tabloid associated with SNS, published disinformative articles that were targeted against Lazović; the Press Council of Serbia later concluded that Srpski telegraf violated the code of journalism due to these articles.

Political positions 
Lazović is a long-time critic of the Belgrade Waterfront project, which he described as a "completely harmful project to the public interest", and as "non-transparent and against the law"; he also called for the termination of the investment contract. He also claimed that "the aim of the project is to fill the pockets of individuals close to the government". In January 2020, he expressed his opposition to the proposal of moving the Old Sava Bridge to Ušće, a Belgrade neighbourhood. A year later, Lazović stated that the  should be moved to an adequate place that experts would decide. He is supportive of public-run transport and had opposed the "BusPlus" system. He is a critic of the Serbian Progressive Party-led government, which he described as authoritarian, and he criticised their approach towards the environment. Additionally, he had criticised SNS politicians Aleksandar Vučić, Nebojša Stefanović, and Goran Vesić.

Lazović is a critic of far-right and anti-immigration politics. He had also stated that he would not "flirt with parties on the right" or with "nationalism and chauvinism". He opposed joining the Alliance for Serbia (SzS) and United Opposition of Serbia (UOPS). He also opposed creation of pre-election coalitions. He later supported the cooperation between NDB and Together for Serbia, a political party led by Nebojša Zelenović. He supported the candidacies of N1 and Nova S television channels during the national frequency addition in August 2022.

He supports the accession of Serbia to the European Union, and aligning Serbia's foreign policies with the European Union. A critic of neoliberalism, he also stated that he would want the European Union to be based on social justice, municipalism, equality, and solidarity. Lazović supported the manifestation of EuroPride in September 2022, citing his support for equal rights for all. He also criticised Rio Tinto, an Anglo-Australian mining corporation, and had also criticised so-called "investor urban planning". He is supportive of workers rights. After the beginning of the 2022 Russian invasion of Ukraine, Lazović took part in several protests in support of Ukraine in Belgrade. He also supports the implementation of sanctions against Russia. Al Jazeera journalist Goran Mišić compared Lazović's rhetoric with mayor of Zagreb, Tomislav Tomašević.

Personal life 
By profession, Lazović is a designer and he previously worked as an art and technical director. He is a fan of the punk rock genre and had also frequently listened to The Clash. Lazović, nicknamed Mika, was previously a writer for newspaper Danas.

Bibliography

References

External links 

Living people
1980 births
Politicians from Belgrade
University of Belgrade alumni
Artists from Belgrade
Art directors
Serbian designers
Serbian newspaper editors
Serbian activists
Environmentalists
Serbian anti-war activists
Anti-corruption activists
Members of the National Assembly (Serbia)
Anti-nationalism
Social justice activists